Hidalgo is a town of approximately 20,000 people, and seat of the Municipality of Hidalgo. It is located in the state of Nuevo León, in Northeastern Mexico.

Features
The major cement company Cemex began with operations here, and still has an operating factory.

The limestone cliffs and spires of the Potrero Chico rock climbing area, in the municipality, draws rock-climbers from across Mexico and around the world.

External links

 https://potrerochico.org/hidalgo/about-hidalgo-nuevo-leon-mexico

Populated places in Nuevo León